Al-Shuhadaa Sport Club, is an Iraqi football team based in Wasit, that plays in Iraq Division Three.

Managerial history
  Emad Omran
  Thaer Jassim
  Haider Hadi

See also 
 2021–22 Iraq Division Three

References

External links
 Iraq Clubs- Foundation Dates

2014 establishments in Iraq
Association football clubs established in 2014
Football clubs in Wasit